Li Chaoyan (born 5 August 1989) is a Chinese Paralympic athlete. He won the gold medal in the men's marathon T46 event at the 2016 Summer Paralympics held in Rio de Janeiro, Brazil. He also won the gold medal in the same event at the 2020 Summer Paralympics held in Tokyo, Japan.

References

External links 
 

Living people
1989 births
Runners from Yunnan
Paralympic medalists in athletics (track and field)
Athletes (track and field) at the 2016 Summer Paralympics
Athletes (track and field) at the 2020 Summer Paralympics
Medalists at the 2016 Summer Paralympics
Medalists at the 2020 Summer Paralympics
Paralympic gold medalists for China
Paralympic athletes of China
Chinese male marathon runners
Chinese amputees
21st-century Chinese people